Batman Day is an annual event organised by DC Entertainment to celebrate and promote Batman.

The first Batman Day was July 23, 2014.  This was the year of the 75th anniversary of the first appearance of Batman in Detective Comics in 1939. The day was chosen to coincide with San Diego Comic-Con.  Subsequent Batman Days have been on the third Saturday in September.

The Batman Day was established by the DC Comics, Warner Bros and DC Entertainment after the very first Superman Day was celebrated on June 12, 2013, the day when Zack Snyder's Man of Steel debuted in theaters.

Events

References

External links
 Batman Day Global Celebration – DC Comics page

Recurring events established in 2014
Batman
September observances